Plunket College of Further Education is a school in Whitehall, Dublin, established in 1967. Originally it was a vocational secondary school for boys, with preparation for the Group, Intermediate and Leaving Certificate, it has developed into a co-educational school focusing on the senior cycle and developing more post-leaving certificate courses in recent years. It is run by the City of Dublin Education and Training Board which replaced the Vocational Education Committee.

As well as Leaving Certificate two and one-year programmes, the college runs post leaving certificate programmes, pre-apprenticeship, Vocational Training Opportunities Scheme (VTOS) and Back to Education Initiative (BTEI) courses.

Its Post-leaving certificate programmes include Accounting Technician (ATI), Psychology, Business & IT, English Language (IELTS), Social Care, Carpentry, QQI Level5 Pre-University (Arts) in association with Trinity Colleges Access Programme (TAP).

Clonturk Community College (CDETB & Educate Together) is based at Plunket College.

References

Further education colleges in Dublin (city)